The 2018 Supercopa de España de Baloncesto was the 15th edition of the tournament since it is organized by the ACB and the 19th overall. It was also called Supercopa Endesa for sponsorship reasons. It was played in the Multiusos Fontes do Sar in Santiago de Compostela in September 2018. Valencia Basket was the defending champion, but did not qualify for the competition.

All times were in Central European Summer Time (UTC+02:00).

Participant teams and draw
On 8 June 2018, the ACB confirmed Santiago de Compostela to host the tournament.

The semifinals were drawn on 12 September 2018, in which Real Madrid and Barça Lassa were seeded teams, given their status as Liga Endesa and Copa del Rey champions, respectively.

Semifinals

FC Barcelona Lassa vs. Kirolbet Baskonia

Monbus Obradoiro vs. Real Madrid

Final

References

External links
Supercopa Endesa website
Supercopa Endesa news

Supercopa de España de Baloncesto
2018–19 in Spanish basketball cups